In probability theory, for a probability measure P on a Hilbert space H with inner product , the covariance of P is the bilinear form Cov: H × H → R given by

for all x and y in H. The covariance operator C is then defined by

(from the Riesz representation theorem, such operator exists if Cov is bounded). Since Cov is symmetric in its arguments, the covariance operator is
self-adjoint. When P is a centred Gaussian measure, C is also a nuclear operator. In particular, it is a compact operator of trace class, that is, it has finite trace.

Even more generally, for a probability measure P on a Banach space B, the covariance of P is the bilinear form on the algebraic dual B#, defined by

where  is now the value of the linear functional x on the element z.

Quite similarly, the covariance function of a function-valued random element (in special cases is called random process or random field) z is

where z(x) is now the value of the function z at the point x, i.e., the value of the linear functional  evaluated at z.

See also

 
 
 
 

Bilinear forms
Covariance and correlation
Probability theory
Hilbert space